Bolteria is a genus of plant bugs in the family Miridae. There are about 18 described species in Bolteria.

Species
These 18 species belong to the genus Bolteria:

 Bolteria amicta Uhler, 1887
 Bolteria arizonae Knight, 1971
 Bolteria atricornis Kelton, 1972
 Bolteria balli Knight, 1928
 Bolteria dakotae Knight, 1971
 Bolteria juniperi Knight, 1968
 Bolteria luteifrons Knight, 1921
 Bolteria mexicana Kelton, 1972
 Bolteria nevadensis Knight, 1971
 Bolteria nicholi Knight, 1928
 Bolteria omani Knight, 1971
 Bolteria picta Schmidt
 Bolteria rubropallida Knight, 1918
 Bolteria schaffneri Knight, 1971
 Bolteria scutata Kelton, 1972
 Bolteria scutellata Kelton, 1972
 Bolteria siouxan Knight, 1971
 Bolteria speciosa (Van Duzee, 1916)

References

Further reading

 
 
 

Articles created by Qbugbot
Mirini